Downtown Erbil (kurdish: Bazara Niştimanî) is a mixed-use project featuring twin towers, residential and commercial space, hotels, malls and parks covering 541,000 square metres, located in Erbil, Iraqi Kurdistan. The $3 billion project was launched by NGC (Nasri Group of Companies).

Gallery

See also

IReferencesI have a 

Economy of Iraq
Erbil
Financial districts